Kurt David Grote (born August 3, 1973) is an American former competition swimmer and Olympic gold medalist.  Grote competed internationally in the breaststroke events during the 1990s.

Grote did not start swimming until the age of fifteen. He began swimming under the advice of a doctor to improve his asthma condition. He attended Stanford University, where he was a member of the Stanford Cardinal swimming and diving team. He also trained with and competed for the Santa Clara Swim Club. After his swimming career, he married a woman named Amy and completed his MD at Stanford.  He has gone on to become a partner in McKinsey & Company's Healthcare Payor and Provider practice.

Grote competed in the 1996 Summer Olympics in Atlanta, Georgia.  He finished sixth in the men's 100-meter breaststroke, eighth in the 200-meter breaststroke, and won a gold medal as a member of the winning U.S. team in the men's 4×100-meter medley relay.

See also
 List of Olympic medalists in swimming (men)
 List of Stanford University people
 List of World Aquatics Championships medalists in swimming (men)

References

External links
 

1973 births
Living people
American male breaststroke swimmers
Olympic gold medalists for the United States in swimming
Stanford Cardinal men's swimmers
Swimmers at the 1996 Summer Olympics
World Aquatics Championships medalists in swimming
Place of birth missing (living people)
Medalists at the 1996 Summer Olympics
Goodwill Games medalists in swimming
Competitors at the 1998 Goodwill Games